Benderli Ali Pasha was an Ottoman statesman. He was Grand Vizier of the Ottoman Empire.

He ruled from 23 March 1821 to 30 April 1821 as grand vizier of Sultan Mahmud II He came to Constantinople on 21 April 1821 and was actually only nine days in power.

He was the last grand vizier clearly executed upon a clear order by a Sultan (Mahmud II).

According to Ottoman biography textbook called Sicill-i Osmani, on 12 April 1821 he was diminished by Sultan Mahmud and was sent to exile in Rhodes, where he died later. Controversially according to Ottoman annals by royal historian Vak'a-nüvis Ahmet Cevdet Efendi (textbook called Tarih-i Cevdet), he was sent in exile to Cyprus and after his departure royal executors were sent to the island. He was interred at Karacaahmet Cemetery in the Üsküdar district of Istanbul.

Sources 

People from Bender, Moldova
19th-century Grand Viziers of the Ottoman Empire
Burials at Karacaahmet Cemetery
Executed people from the Ottoman Empire
Moldavian Muslims
19th-century executions by the Ottoman Empire
Executed Moldovan people
Year of birth missing
1821 deaths